John Hawkins Anderson (1805 – 24 December 1870) was a member of the Legislative Council of Nova Scotia, and then a member of the Senate of Canada. A Liberal, he was appointed to the Senate on 23 October 1867 by a royal proclamation of Queen Victoria following Canadian Confederation earlier that year. He represented the senatorial division of Nova Scotia until his death.

References 

 

1805 births
1870 deaths
Canadian senators from Nova Scotia
Liberal Party of Canada senators